The Miraculous Medal, also known as the Medal of Our Lady of Graces, is a devotional medal, the design of which was originated by Catherine Labouré following her apparitions of the Blessed Virgin Mary in the Chapel of Our Lady of the Miraculous Medal of Paris, France. It was made by goldsmith Adrien Vachette.

According to the teaching of the Catholic Church, the use of sacramentals such as this medal prepares people to receive grace and disposes them to cooperate with it.

Background 
Catherine Labouré stated that on 18 July 1830, the eve of the feast of Saint Vincent de Paul, she woke up after hearing the voice of a child calling her to the chapel, where she heard the Virgin Mary say to her, "God wishes to charge you with a mission. You will be contradicted, but do not fear; you will have the grace to do what is necessary. Tell your spiritual director all that passes within you. Times are evil in France and in the world."

On 27 November 1830, Catherine reported that the Blessed Mother returned during evening meditations. She displayed herself inside an oval frame, standing upon a globe. She wore many rings set with gems that shone rays of light over the globe. Around the margin of the frame appeared the words Ô Marie, conçue sans péché, priez pour nous qui avons recours à vous ("O Mary, conceived without sin, pray for us who have recourse to thee"). 

As Catherine watched, the frame seemed to rotate, showing a circle of twelve stars, a large letter M surmounted by a cross, and the stylized Sacred Heart of Jesus crowned with thorns and Immaculate Heart of Mary pierced with a sword. Asked why some of the gems did not shed light, Mary reportedly replied, "Those are the graces for which people forget to ask." Sister Catherine then heard the Virgin Mary ask her to take these images to her father confessor, telling him that they should be put on medallions, and saying "All who wear them will receive great graces."

Sister Catherine did so, and after two years of investigation and observation of Catherine's ordinary daily behavior, the priest took the information to his archbishop without revealing Catherine's identity. The request was approved and medallions were designed and produced through goldsmith Adrien Vachette.

The chapel in which Saint Catherine experienced her visions is located at the mother house of the Daughters of Charity in Rue du Bac, Paris. The incorrupt bodies of Saint Catherine Labouré and Saint Louise de Marillac, a co-founder of the Congregation of the Daughters of Charity of Saint Vincent de Paul, are interred in the chapel, which continues to receive daily visits from Catholic pilgrims today.

Pope John Paul II used a slight variation of the reverse image as his coat of arms, the Marian Cross, a plain cross with an M underneath the right-hand bar (which signified the Blessed Virgin at the foot of the Cross when Jesus was being crucified).

Properties of the medal 
Front side:
 Mary stands on the earth, crushing a serpent beneath her feet. Describing the original vision, Catherine said the Blessed Mother appeared radiant as a sunrise, "in all her perfect beauty".
 Rays shine forth from Mary's hands. She told Catherine these "symbolize the graces I shed upon those who ask for them."
 Words from the vision, originally in French, form an oval frame around the image: "O Mary, conceived without sin, pray for us who have recourse to thee."

Reverse side:
 A cross-and-bar surmount a large, bold "M".
 Twelve stars mark the perimeter.
 Two hearts are depicted underneath the "M", the left encircled with a crown of thorns, the right pierced by a sword. From each, a flame emanates from the top.

Symbolism
The elements of the design encapsulate major Catholic dogmas concerning Mariology that have been declared official doctrine by the Catholic Church.

Front side:
 Mother – Her open arms, the "recourse" believers have in her.
 Immaculate – The words, "conceived without sin".
 Assumed into Heaven – She stands on the globe, Queen of Heaven and Earth.
 Mediatrix – Rays from her hands symbolizing "graces".
 Protectrix – Crushes the serpent underfoot to proclaim that Satan and all his followers are helpless before her. (Genesis 3:15).

Reverse side:
 The large letter "M" – Mary as Mother, Mediatrix.
 Cross and bar – Jesus' Cross of Redemption for mankind. The interlacing of the M and the Cross shows Mary’s close involvement with Jesus, and points to her role as Mediatrix.
 12 stars – the Twelve Apostles and the vision of Saint John the Apostle in Revelation 12:1: "And a great sign appeared in heaven: A woman clothed with the sun, and the moon under her feet, and on her head a crown of twelve stars."
 Left Heart – The Sacred Heart of Jesus, Who died for the sins of mankind.
 Right Heart – The Immaculate Heart of Mary, who intercedes for sinners.
 Flames above both hearts – The burning love both Jesus and Mary have for all people.

See also 
 Alliance of the Hearts of Jesus and Mary
 Chapel of Our Lady of the Miraculous Medal
 Marian Cross
 Stabat Mater (art)
 Saint Benedict Medal
 Green Scapular
 Fivefold Scapular

Notes

References 

 Alma Power-Waters, 2000, St. Catherine Labouré and the Miraculous Medal, Ignatius Press, 
 Saint Catherine Labouré of the Miraculous Medal, by Joseph I Dirvin, CM, TAN Books and Publishers, Inc, 1958/84. 
 Association of the Miraculous Medal
 Rene Laurentin, Catherine Laboure: Visionary of the Miraculous Medal, Pauline books and Media, Boston, 2006, .

External links 

 Chapel of the Miraculous Medal – the site of the visitations and the resting place of Saint Catherine

Devotional medals
Marian devotions
Marian apparitions
Catholic devotions
1830 establishments in France
1830 in Christianity